These are the Canadian number-one albums of 2022. The chart is compiled by Nielsen SoundScan and published in Billboard magazine as Top Canadian Albums.

Number-one albums

See also
 List of Canadian Hot 100 number-one singles of 2022
 List of number-one digital songs of 2022 (Canada)

References

External links
 Billboard Top Canadian Albums

2022
Canada Albums
2022 in Canadian music